Suli Top is a Himalayan mountain peak in the Pithoragarh district of the Uttarakhand state of India.  It is situated over the eastern flank of Kalabaland Glacier, east of Johar Valley.  The other peaks on the massif are Chiring We (6,559 m), Trigal (5,983 m), and Bamba Dhura (6,334 m), etc.  This ridge is a geographical divide between Lassar and Kalabaland valley. The first ascent to the summit was achieved in 1986.

Mountains of Uttarakhand
Geography of Pithoragarh district